"Always Come Back to Your Love" is a song by Irish singer Samantha Mumba, released as the third single from her debut studio album, Gotta Tell You (2000), on 19 February 2001. The song was written by Hallgeir Rustan and producers Stargate, who recorded it at the producers' Norwegian studio. "Always Come Back to Your Love" was Mumba's second and final song to top the Irish Singles Chart in her home country of Ireland, as it peaked at number one on the chart dated 22 February 2001. It also peaked in the top 10 in United Kingdom and Romania, reaching numbers three and ten on their respective charts. However, the song stalled outside the top 40 in Australia and New Zealand.

Music video
The video starts off with Mumba exiting a car that just pulled into a building, and she starts singing. It cuts to a new scene where Mumba is sitting with friends in a blue room while boys walk in; the video switches between this scene and her dancing a routine. These three scenes continue to switch during the rest of the song.

Track listings
UK and Australian CD single
 "Always Come Back to Your Love" (with rap)
 "Always Come Back to Your Love" (Cevin Fisher vocal mix)
 "Always Come Back to Your Love" (DJ Disciple vocal club mix)
 "Always Come Back to Your Love" (video)

UK cassette single
 "Always Come Back to Your Love" (with rap) – 3:49
 "Always Come Back to Your Love" (Almighty mix) – 8:48

European promo CD
 "Always Come Back to Your Love" (without rap) – 3:49
 "Always Come Back to Your Love" (with rap) – 3:49

Credits and personnel
Credits are lifted from the UK and Australian CD single liner notes.

Studio
 Recorded and mixed at Stargate Studios (Norway)

Personnel

 Samantha Mumba – vocals
 Stargate – production, vocal production (as D-Flex)
 Mikkel S.E. – writing, all instruments
 Hallgeir Rustan – writing, all instruments
 Tor Erik Hermansen – writing, all instruments

 Aaron Chakraverty – mastering
 Lorenzo Agius – photography
 Brill Management Dublin – management
 Louis Walsh – management

Charts

Weekly charts

Year-end charts

Certifications

Release history

References

2000 songs
2001 singles
Irish Singles Chart number-one singles
Polydor Records singles
Samantha Mumba songs
Song recordings produced by Stargate (record producers)
Songs written by Hallgeir Rustan
Songs written by Mikkel Storleer Eriksen
Songs written by Tor Erik Hermansen